A tactical operations center (TOC) is a command post for police, paramilitary, or military operations. A TOC usually includes a small group of specially trained officers or military personnel who guide members of an active tactical element during a mission.

Most permanent tactical operations centers are highly technical and contain a number of advanced computer systems for monitoring operational progress and maintaining communications with operators in the field. One of the best-known TOCs is NORAD, which conducts North American airspace defense operations.

TOC officers are usually positioned in a way that enables line-of-sight communication between team members, as well as overall communication with the TOC operations officer (or commander). Common configurations include center-facing monitors and against the wall monitors. Larger TOCs have a location where senior leaders are able to sit and observe operations of subordinate units. Smaller TOCs and field TOCs can be created in the back of vans and trucks, as well as in tents and buildings by setting up computers and linking in communication equipment.

See also 

 Emergency operations center

References

External links
Global Security TOC Guidelines
NORAD “About NORAD” Website

Military locations